Chalawa is a Pakistani supernatural horror drama series directed by Najaf Bilgrami and Shamoon Abbasi and premiered on Hum TV on 8 November 2020. It is produced by M. Nadeem J. and Umer Mukhtar under MD Productions and NJ Films. The drama stars Noor Zafar, Ali Ansari and Naveen Waqar in the lead.

Plot 
Chalawa is supernatural story of a young girl named Sawera who is possessed by birth by a Chalawa (a type of supernatural demon) having the ability of betrayal and illusion. Her father Aamir had died before her birth but little did she know that Professor Hamdani was behind the betrayal who on the other hand seemed to be a savior to her mother Mahnoor earlier in her childhood after he "helped" get rid of the Chalawa named Sarnash from Sawera.

Cast

Main 

 Noor Zafar Khan as Sawera Ahmed Turk
 Naveen Waqar as Mahnoor; Sawera's mother
 Ali Ansari as Harib Khanzada / Sarnash (when possessed by him)
 Adnan Jaffar as Professor Faraz Hamdani
 Usama Khan as Sarosh (Dead) / Kaafur (when possessed by the Chalawa Kaafur)

Recurring 
 Tahir Jatoi as Azlaan (Dead); a Jinn who was made a well-wisher to Mahnoor and later helped Sawera
 Fawad Jalal as Amir Ahmed Turk (Dead); Sawera's father
 Samina Ahmed as Khala / Dadi (Dead)
 Naveed Raza as Fawaad
 Emmad Butt as Sarosh's father
 Unknown as Mehak; Sarosh's mother
 Tabbasum Arif as Tehmina, Harib's mother
 Sohail Masood as Sarfarz, Scoohl's principal
 Zain Ullah as Zayn
 Hina Sheikh as Principal's wife
 Anoushey Rania Khan as Sawera (Young)
 Ashir Ali Khan as Sarnash/Chalawa (Young)

References

External links 
 Official Website
 

Pakistani drama television series
2020 Pakistani television series debuts
2021 Pakistani television series endings
Urdu-language television shows
Hum TV original programming
Hum TV
Pakistani horror fiction television series
Pakistani television series endings